James Armor House is a historic home located near Wilmington, New Castle County, Delaware. It is a -story, stuccoed stone and frame dwelling that was constructed in three major building phases. It consists of a two-story stone rear wing dating to about 1804, a -story vernacular Italianate style stone main block built about 1850, and two-story Colonial Revival style frame wing built in the 1930s. Also on the property is a contributing garage/workshop built in the 1930s.

It was added to the National Register of Historic Places in 1992.

References

Houses on the National Register of Historic Places in Delaware
Italianate architecture in Delaware
Houses completed in 1804
Houses in New Castle County, Delaware
National Register of Historic Places in New Castle County, Delaware